Eneko Jauregi Escobar (born 13 July 1996) is a Spanish professional footballer who plays as a forward for SD Amorebieta.

Club career
Born in Muxika, Biscay, Basque Country, Jauregi finished his formation with Gernika Club. On 14 May 2014, he joined Real Sociedad, and was subsequently assigned to the farm team in Tercera División.

Ahead of the 2015–16 season, Jauregi was promoted to the reserves in Segunda División B. On 24 June 2017, he extended his contract for a further year.

On 29 January 2018, Jauregi signed a two-and-a-half-year contract with Segunda División side Cádiz CF. The following day, he moved to fellow league team Córdoba CF on loan until June.

Jauregi made his professional debut on 11 February 2018, coming on as a second-half substitute for Juanjo Narváez in a 1–5 away loss against CD Tenerife. On 23 August, he was loaned to Atlético Levante UD for one year.

References

External links

1996 births
Living people
People from Busturialdea
Sportspeople from Biscay
Footballers from the Basque Country (autonomous community)
Spanish footballers
Association football forwards
Segunda División players
Primera Federación players
Segunda División B players
Tercera División players
Real Sociedad C footballers
Real Sociedad B footballers
Cádiz CF players
Córdoba CF players
Atlético Levante UD players
UCAM Murcia CF players
Lleida Esportiu footballers
UD San Sebastián de los Reyes players
SD Amorebieta footballers
Super League Greece players
Asteras Tripolis F.C. players
Spanish expatriate footballers
Spanish expatriate sportspeople in Greece
Expatriate footballers in Greece